Foxbar is a district of Paisley, bordered by the Gleniffer Braes and Paisley town centre. Consisting mostly of residential areas, Foxbar has rapidly grown over the past century to be one of the largest housing areas in the town.
An area of low socioeconomic levels and poor social mobility, the local authority (Renfrewshire Council) has invested significantly in the area, which nowadays boasts multiple community centres, public parks and social areas.

Districts
Consisting of various sub-districts, Foxbar contains areas including the top end and bottom end, spam valley/meikleriggs and the green road end amongst others. All areas are highly populated with housing areas. 
Each area has a mixture of both private and local authority housing. For many years the low incomes and little investment created drug problems throughout the area. In the early 2000’s the rise in gang violence led to running battles between “the tap end” and “the bottom end division”. Urban decay had started to set in to some areas of the social housing such as Waverley road and Durrockstock dam had fell into disrepair. In 2022 Renfrewshire council investment was prominent in the Durrockstock park which seen a new modern playground installed.

Housing
The district consists of local authority, housing association and privately owned housing. In recent years there has been significant investment in private and social housing including the construction of new build estates and refurbishment of existing tenement buildings and Oliphant court, Foxbar's only remaining high rise.

Foxbar previously had five 14 storey high rise flats, each containing 56 flats situated above Durrockstock park in the top end area of the district.
 Oliphant Court
 Marmion Court
 Heriot Court
 Montrose Court
 Waverley Court

Waverley Court was demolished in 1996 followed by Marmion, Montrose and Heriot Court in 2004. Oliphant Court was refurbished in recent years and is currently owned and maintained by Paisley South housing association.

Services and retail
The area has many services and local businesses that supply the large population.

Schools
Foxbar has 3 primary schools (Heriot, St. Pauls and Brediland) and one secondary school (Gleniffer High).

Retail
For a modern housing development, Foxbar comparably has a large retail presence. Currently the various sub-areas are supplied by multiple local newsagents and grocery stores; however post office facilities, a pharmacy and a local butcher also are available. Understandably so for Paisley`s biggest area of housing.

Within recent years L.A. Studios have set themselves up to cater for hair and beauty demand.

Many takeaway restaurants have established a business within the area. With two Chinese (Wok Inn and Happy Valley) and a takeaway Indian, Fish, Pizza and Kebab shop (Marco's), the residents have a comfortable option of choice.

Amenities
Foxbar has 3 community centres and one library. The main Foxbar community centre is situated beneath the library on Amochrie Road and Ivanhoe Road. The Youth Drop In is situated on Spey Avenue. The resource centre is situated on Amochrie Road.

Public transport
Foxbar has five different buses that go through the housing scheme. It has McGills Bus Service's 61 which goes from the town to the top of Foxbar and the 60 which goes from either Paisley or St Mirren St to Heriot Avenue via the Royal Alexandra Hospital.  There is also a McGills bus, service 10 which goes from Dykebar to Morar Drive via Paisley. Arriva also operate a morning service X21 to Glasgow via the M8 and back again in the evening.

Popular places
Popular places in Foxbar are Durrockstock Park, which is a Local Nature Reserve and the walkway to the Gleniffer Braes.

Geography

References

Housing estates in Scotland
Areas in Paisley, Renfrewshire